Abdi Farah Saed (Juxa) is Somali puntite, served as Radio Kulmis correspondent and former Minister of Education (Puntland). 

On 21 March 2017, he was appointed as the Minister of Interior and Federal affairs by the Prime Minister.

Juxa belongs to the Isse Mohamoud sub-clan of (Mohamoud Saleiman) Majeerteen, Harti, Darod clan.

References

Puntland politicians
Living people
Place of birth missing (living people)
1945 births